André Lassagne (23 April 1911 – 3 April 1953) was a member of the French Resistance during World War II. The secretary general of "L'Armée Secrète" (AS), he was arrested (along with Jean Moulin) on June 21, 1943, in Caluire-et-Cuire (Rhône). After the war he became Senator for Rhone and was awarded the Legion d'Honneur.

Before the war

Childhood
Lassagne was born in Lyon, France.

Teaching and Military Careers

Resistance

Capture

Concentration Camps

After the war

Recognition
 Légion d'honneur
 Quai André Lassagne
 College André Lassagne
 Rue André Lassagne

Publication
Feuillets Clandestins De Fresnes - (8 Juillet 1943-16 Février 1944)

External links
 Profile on French Senate website

1911 births
1953 deaths
Politicians from Lyon
French Resistance members
Recipients of the Legion of Honour
French Senators of the Fifth Republic
Senators of Rhône (department)